The Texas Prison Museum is located in Huntsville, Texas.

The non-profit museum features the history of the prison system in Texas (Huntsville is the home of the Texas Department of Criminal Justice and several prisons including the Ellis Unit which previously housed death row, and Huntsville Unit which houses the execution chamber).  There are many different artifacts in the museum, including an electric chair named "Old Sparky" that was formerly used from 1924 to 1964 as the primary means of execution.

The museum was founded in 1989 and originally located in downtown Huntsville.  It moved to its current location northwest of town (on Texas State Highway 75 at Interstate 45 Exit 118) in 2002.

The museum holds a lot of valuable knowledge that is made to educate people about how the prison system has evolved over time. The artifacts that are held in the museum offer a look inside the various aspects of a prison. In addition, the museum offers information about the famous Bonnie and Clyde as it takes a look at their abdominal theft charge. The museum is a great place to visit if you have any interest in true crime!

References

External links
 Texas Prison Museum website

Prison museums in Texas
Museums in Walker County, Texas
Huntsville, Texas
Museums established in 1989